Michael Rubens (also sometimes known as Mike Rubens) is an American comedian and author.

In February 2016, Rubens began working as a correspondent and field producer for Full Frontal with Samantha Bee. He was formerly a field producer for The Daily Show with Jon Stewart and Last Week Tonight. He has written four novels: The Sheriff of Yrnameer (2009), Sons of the 613 (2012), The Bad Decisions Playlist (2016), and Emily and the Spellstone (2017). He lives in Brooklyn, New York with his wife and daughter.

References

External links

Living people
Television producers from New York City
21st-century American writers
21st-century American comedians
Year of birth missing (living people)